Torreorgaz is a municipality in the province of Cáceres, Extremadura, Spain. According to the 2017 census (INE), the municipality has a population of 1669 inhabitants.

References 

Municipalities in the Province of Cáceres